The Greenland Ice Sheet Project (GISP) was a decade-long project to drill ice cores in Greenland that involved scientists and funding agencies from Denmark, Switzerland and the United States. Besides the U.S. National Science Foundation (NSF), funding was provided by the Swiss National Science Foundation and the Danish Commission for Scientific Research in Greenland. The ice cores provide a proxy archive of temperature and atmospheric constituents that help to understand past climate variations.

The preliminary GISP field work started in 1971 at Dye 3, where a 372 meter deep, 10.2 cm diameter core was recovered. After this, annual field expeditions were carried out to drill intermediate depth cores at various locations on the ice sheet. The first was a 398 m core at Milcent and another was a 405 m core at the Crete station in 1974. After working out various logistical and engineering problems related to the development of a more sophisticated drilling rig, drilling to bedrock at Dye 3 began in the summer of 1979 using a new Danish electro-mechanical ice drill. In the first year, an 18 cm diameter hole was drilled and cased to a depth of 80 m. Coring continued for two more seasons, and on August 10, 1981, bedrock was reached at a depth of 2037 m. The Dye 3 site was a compromise: glaciologically, a higher site on the ice divide with smooth bedrock would have been better; logistically, such a site would have been too remote.

GISP drilling operations

GISP2
There was a follow-up U.S. GISP2 project, which drilled at a glaciologically better location on the summit of the ice sheet. This hit bedrock (and drilled another 1.55 m into bedrock) on July 1, 1993 after five years of drilling, while European scientists produced a parallel core in the GRIP project. GISP2 produced an ice core 3053.44 meters in depth, the deepest ice core recovered in the world at the time.

The location of the GISP2 drilling was revisited annually during summer campaigns to investigate the post-depositional properties of gasses and aerosols in the firn. Eventually, GISP2 and Summit Camp became the site of a year-round NSF / NOAA climate observatory and research facility known as the Greenland Environmental Observatory or GEOSummit.

The bulk of the GISP2 ice core is archived at the National Ice Core Laboratory in Lakewood, Colorado, United States.

See also
 Clair Patterson
 Dye 3
 EPICA
 North Greenland Ice Core Project (NGRIP)

References

Sources

External links
GISP from the NOAA World Data Center for paleoclimatology
GISP2

Geochronological institutions and organizations
Arctic research
Climate of Greenland